The 8th Sarasaviya Awards festival (Sinhala: 8වැනි සරසවිය සම්මාන උලෙළ), presented by the Associated Newspapers of Ceylon Limited, was held to honor the best films of 1979 Sinhala cinema on March 29, 1980, at the Colombo New Theater Grounds, Sri Lanka. It was held after ten years gap due to the political unrest prevailed in the country. Minister of Lands, Land Development and Mahaweli Development Gamini Dissanayake was the chief guest at the awards night.

The film Handaya won the most awards with seven including Best Film.

Awards

References

Sarasaviya Awards
Sarasaviya